Bench press world records are the international records in bench press across the years, regardless of weight class or governing organization, for bench pressing on the back without using a bridge technique.

The women's equipped bench press record belongs to Rae-Ann Coughenour-Miller from the United States, who lifted  (2022, Metal Militia Powerlifting standards), and the raw bench press record belongs to April Mathis also from the United States, who lifted  (2016, Southern Powerlifting Federation standards).

Before 1973

Foundation of the IPF 
With the foundation of the International Powerlifting Federation (IPF), the federation began keeping "official" powerlifting world records as the international governing body for the sport of powerlifting. Previous records which hadn't been set within the newly established rules, were reset (for example, elbow bandages had been allowed prior to the formation of the IPF, but were later outlawed). These are the official bench press records after the IPF-reset until they surpass the previously set mark of 306 kg (675 lb) by Jim Williams.

Equipped (with bench shirt) 

* note: Anthony Clark performed a controversial 800-pound bench press at the Arnold Classic in 1997, 2 years before Tim Isaac. This lift was, however, later turned down.

Unequipped (without bench shirt)
For the bench press to be considered raw, no bench shirts are allowed; however, wrist wraps, singlets and belts are allowed. Elbow bandages had been allowed prior to the formation of the IPF, but were later outlawed.

IPC powerlifting
International Paralympic Committee regulates unequipped paralympic powerlifting competition without wrist wraps or belt.

See also
 Squat world records
 Deadlift world records
 Progression of the deadlift world record
 Paralympic bench press world records
 NFL Scouting Combine bench press records

References

Powerlifting
Bench press